Take My Life is an American film released in 1942. It featured a group of young actors known as the Harlem Tuff Kids. In this film they join the U.S. Army. The group also appeared in the 1939 film Reform School. Both were produced by Million Dollar Productions. Oakton Community College has a poster for the film in its collection. The poster includes the taglines Harlem Goes to War! and Thrill to the Brown Bombers in Action.

Toddy Pictures re-released the film as Murder Rap. The film premiered at the Apollo Theater in Harlem.

Cast
Monte Hawley as Dr. Thurman
Jeni LeGon as Helen Stanley
Arthur Ray
Freddie Jackson as Johnmy
Eugene Jackson as Bill
Harry Levette
Jack Carr as Sgt. Holmes
Paul White as Icky

References

1942 films
American black-and-white films
1942 crime drama films
American crime drama films
Films directed by Leo C. Popkin
1940s American films